AhmadiPedia (a portmanteau of "The Ahmadiyya Encyclopaedia") is an online encyclopedia dedicated to the study of the Worldwide Ahmadiyya Muslim Community. It is edited and maintained by the Ahmadiyya Archive & Research Centre (ARC) and is an official publication of the Ahmadiyya Muslim Jamaat.

Background 
According to the curator at ARC, "a need was felt that a resource is created where Ahmadis and even non-Ahmadis could search for information about the Ahmadiyya Muslim Jamaat." Hence, AhmadiPedia was launched.

Launch 

AhmadiPedia was launched on 2 July 2021 by Hazrat Mirza Masroor Ahmad, the fifth worldwide head of the Ahmadiyya Muslim Jamaat, after the Friday prayers. Announcing the launch during his Friday sermon, he stated: I would like to make an announcement and that is that an Ahmadiyya Encyclopaedia has been created and will be launched today; it has been prepared by the Central Ahmadiyya Archive & Research Centre.

They began work on it some time ago and now, by the grace of Allah the Almighty, this website is being made available... It is available on www.ahmadipedia.org, where a homepage containing a search engine will open and can be used to search for information...

Content 
AhmadiPedia is edited by a team of editors at the ARC which draws on the primary sources of the Ahmadiyya Muslim Community for its content. The encyclopedia entries give concise information but provide links and references to the Community's literature for further study.

Users have also been given the option to provide material via the 'contribute' page, which is then edited and uploaded to the website by the editors.

Censorship of AhmadiPedia 
Pakistan Telecommunication Authority (PTA) regularly blocks content from Ahmadiyya websites, including AhmadiPedia.org. Hence, just over a month into its launch, AhmadiPedia was blocked in Pakistan.

References

External links 
 Friday Sermon mentioning the launch of AhmadiPedia
 Khalifa Launches AhmadiPedia (MTA International news report via YouTube)
 An introduction to AhmadiPedia (YouTube)
 Al Hakam news report on the launch of AhmadiPedia

Online encyclopedias